68K/OS was a computer operating system developed by GST Computer Systems for the Sinclair QL microcomputer.

It was commissioned by Sinclair Research in February 1983. However, after the official launch of the QL in January 1984, 68K/OS was rejected, and production QLs shipped with Sinclair's own Qdos operating system.

GST later released 68K/OS as an alternative to Qdos, in the form of an EPROM expansion card, and also planned to use it on single-board computers based on the QL's hardware.

The operating system was developed by Chris Scheybeler, Tim Ward, Howard Chalkley and others.

The few ROM cards that were made mean that surviving examples now fetch a high price: On Feb 04, 2010 one sold for £310 on eBay.

References

External links
 GST Assembler, Adder Assembler - Sinclair User, April 1985
 QL Pictures Gallery
 68k/OS manuals and documentation

Proprietary operating systems
Sinclair Research
Discontinued operating systems
68k architecture